Simon Fletcher is an English artist.

Early life

Fletcher was born in Birmingham, England, in 1948. Due to asthma he was unable to attend school until age thirteen, so he
was partly educated at home, spending much time reading. At the age of eighteen he attended life drawing classes at the
old St Alban's School of Art.

In 1966 he went to St Alban’s Art School, studying under John Brunsden for printmaking and Maurice Field for painting. In 1967 he studied Graphic Design at Watford Art School, where he studied under David Hockney, Richard Hamilton, Dieter Roth and Mark Boyle. At Watford he studied printmaking, photography and graphics; he learnt photography from Raymond Moore, and he devoted himself to the study of printing techniques, particularly etching. In 1968 he began a three-year course of watercolour painting at West Surrey College of Art and Design (now the University for the Creative Arts), in Farnham, Surrey, taught by Harold Cheesman (1915–82), a pupil of the English surrealist Paul Nash. Cheesman taught him literature and art theory as well as watercolour techniques, and Cheesman’s watercolours have influenced Fletcher’s art. Fletcher qualified with a degree in Fine Art in 1971.

Career

After qualifying, he worked as a researcher for the Forestry Commission. In 1972 he became the Artistic Director of 'Gardenesque Landscape Design' in Liphook, Hampshire, where he also studied landscape design under Peter Coates and John Brookes. His landscapes included sculptures and ceramics, and his first large-scale project involved designing a 20-hectare park complete with its own lake for German newspaper magnate Martin Brost, who later became his patron.

In 1974 he travelled to France and Morocco to concentrate on drawing and painting. In 1975 he moved to Oxford and set up his own garden design company. In 1978 he became the director of the Oxford Printmakers' Cooperative for two years, and in 1980 he won first prize in the British Association of Landscape Industries Awards for his design of a Hampshire garden.

Between 1975 and 1982 Fletcher travelled around Europe and Africa, working and exhibiting. In 1978 he put on his first solo exhibition of paintings in the Picasso Gallery in Menorca. Whilst in Menorca he produced a series of landscape etchings for a Spanish publishing company. In 1980 he put on an exhibition of prints at La Galleria, Menorca.

In 1980 the National Portrait Gallery in London accepted a self-portrait of Fletcher from an entry of over 500 portraits for a major exhibition and in 1981 exhibited his portrait of Oxford mathematician Giles Christian. His still life drawings were shown and sold by Aberbach Fine Art, London. He still paints portraits on commission at his studio in France

In 1982 he moved with his family to Montpellier, France, where he could work outdoors all day in most seasons. He held an exhibition at the Institute Franco Allemagne, in Darmstadt, Germany, in 1986. He has exhibited in France, Austria, Germany, Switzerland and Italy. Working often in Germany he exhibited with some of the most prominent painters of the day, Fetting, Penk, Salzmann In 1983 he won a ‘Diplome d’Honneur’ from the Salon D’Agde, and the first prize for watercolour from the Mouvement Artistique Francaise. In 2000 he won the Gold medal for watercolour from the Salon International de Béziers.
Simon Fletcher - work in progress

After his arts degree ( Diplome de Beaux Arts) Fletcher began his career as a landscape designer and artist but watercolour was always at the centre of his activities and in 1982 he moved to France to paint. His contact with German painters and galleries convinced him that the most innovative modern work in watercolour had been done in Germany and Austria during the first half of the 20th century and the legacy of this period is still being felt in Europe and the US. As Robert Hughes noted in his piece on Morris Louis, much post war US painting was water colour; the strongly pigmented Liquitex paints used by a generation of acrylic painters on white canvas closely resemble watercolour.
Painting in this tradition, Fletcher uses the most modern available watercolour paints; he is in touch with paint makers  and wants the best, most permanent colours for his large colourful paintings. 
His years of drawing and study of landscape can be seen in the carefully constructed compositions that are such a characteristic element in his painting and which have earned him the reputation of one of the most important artists working in watercolour today.
Fletcher has shown with the best known painters of his generation, written eleven books about his work in watercolour and pastel, has the gold medal for watercolour from the Salon International de Beziers and has been sponsored by amongst others, Hitachi Corporation, Siemans Germany, Faber Castell, The Economist, The British Embassy Oman.
His work is in public and private collections all over the world.

From Simon Fletcher, an appraisal. The Artist Magazine 2008

“It is the combination of classical precision and order and modern vibrancy and vigour that makes Fletcher’s paintings so timeless and enduringly pleasurable to look at.”
 Catherine Milner 2013

Catherine Milner was, for more than ten years, the Arts Correspondent for the Sunday Telegraph and has written about contemporary art for a number of newspapers and magazines including the Financial Times, The Economist, Apollo Magazine and Art Review. She is currently curator for Messums Wiltshire and recently chose works by Simon Fletcher for an exhibition there

“Simon Fletcher who has lived in France since 1982 has shown often in Germany and Austria with Salzmann, Vogel, Fetting, Penke etc and is considered one of the most eminent living watercolourists having several books published about his watercolours. His enthusiasm for the medium has taken him and his works all over the world for exhibitions and seminars and converted many painters to the new possibilities that modern pigments and materials offer to painters.”

The economist Magazine 2004

“Then there are the colours, strong, vivid, bold, yes, Turneresque in their
readiness to go to the extremes of the palette. This tendency has grown with
time and his stay on the continent and visits to Japan seem to have
reinforced a confidence in his reaction to strong colours.

If he applies them with equal assurance in bold atmospheric washes as well
as in very precise representations, notably in paintings that blend the
specific with the atmospheric, this shows the range of approaches that Simon
Fletcher has in his possession. Is it English, in the sense that we use the
term, "English water colour"? Hardly. Is it European? Not obviously. Is
it personal and real? Without a doubt.”

Sir John Tusa,
Managing Director,
Barbican Art Center, London. 2001

He has painted in Morocco, Japan, Oman, India, and Martinique whilst publishing books and articles about his work and giving occasional seminars on drawing and painting.

Works

Fletcher published a book on watercolour, L’Aquarelle, Art de la Transparence (Fleurus, 1995), about the history and technique of watercolour in Europe, Wine and Landscape of the Languedoc,  co-produced with author and journalist Rupert Wright, published simultaneously in French and English in 2005. In all he has published ten books about his painting the latest being 'Pastel Praxis' for Edition M Fischer, Munich Germany. For a complete list of publications see www.simonfletcher.org/publications
Considered by many critics in Europe to be one of the prominent painters in watercolour today, his work has been sponsored by many large companies and organisations including Hitachi, Japan; Semens, Germany; The Economist, Frankfurt.
In 2019 Fletcher was commissioned to create a huge mural by the State run ESAT, centre for the handicapped, in the south of France near Beziers. The work, which took most of the year to design, photograph and print is 70m² and is installed in the recreation hall of the centre. see Fletcher's web site for pictures

External links

References

1948 births
Living people
20th-century English painters
English male painters
21st-century English painters
21st-century English male artists
Artists from Birmingham, West Midlands
20th-century English male artists